Apomastus is a genus of North American mygalomorph spiders in the family Euctenizidae, and was first described by Jason Bond & B. D. Opell in 2002.  it contains only two species, both found in the Los Angeles Basin of southern California: A. kristenae and A. schlingeri.

References

External links
Apomastus at BugGuide

Further reading

Euctenizidae
Mygalomorphae genera
Spiders of the United States